Euprox is an extinct genus of deer that lived in Eurasia during the Miocene.

Taxonomy
The type species Euprox furcatus was originally under the genus Prox, but that name was already taken. Depéret assigned it to the related genus Dicrocerus in 1887, before it was assigned to its current placement in 1928. Euprox dicranocerus and Euprox minimus were transferred to the genus soon after; they were originally described as Cervus dicranocerus and Dicracerus minimus, respectively.

Description
Euprox was some of the earliest types of deer known to have true antlers.

The antlers of Euprox were short, with two small prongs projecting from the main branch. Euprox is notable for being the earliest deer to possess the presence of a real burr, which are indicative of the border between permanent and deciduous segments of deer antlers. It possessed brachyodont teeth and likely fed on leaves. The environment that Euprox inhabited would have been warm and humid, with many tropical forests.

References

Prehistoric deer
Miocene mammals of Europe
Miocene mammals of Asia
Prehistoric even-toed ungulate genera
Miocene even-toed ungulates